Abubakar Balarabe (born 14 June 1968) is a former Nigerian international footballer who played as a midfielder for clubs in Nigeria, Belgium, the Netherlands and Malaysia.

Club career
Balarabe began playing football for Ranchers Bees of Kaduna. He moved to Europe in 1989, and would play for K.F.C. Eeklo and MVV Maastricht.

International career
Balarabe made two appearances for the senior Nigeria national football team. He scored on his debut, a 1990 African Nations Cup qualifier against Guinea in 1989.

References

External links

Voetbal International profile

1968 births
Living people
Nigerian footballers
Nigeria international footballers
MVV Maastricht players
Association football forwards